Callow Hill may refer to the following places in England:

Callow Hill, Herefordshire, a location
Callow Hill, Shropshire, a hill
Callow Hill, Somerset, a location
Callow Hill, Wiltshire, a hamlet
Callow Hill, Worcestershire, a hamlet near Redditch
Callow Hill, Wyre Forest, a location near Bewdley